Berta Morena (27 January 1878 - 7 October 1952) was a German operatic dramatic soprano.

She saw success at once, and remained on the company's roster until 1923. Her American debut came at the Metropolitan Opera in the role of Sieglinde on March 4, 1908; the company reengaged her from 1910 to 1912 and again from 1924 until 1925. In 1914 she appeared at Covent Garden. Morena had a reputation as a great singing actress, and was especially admired for her prowess in the major soprano roles of Richard Wagner. Morena died in Rottach-Egern.

References

1878 births
1952 deaths
German operatic sopranos
19th-century German women opera singers
20th-century German women opera singers
Musicians from Mannheim